Delicious is a series of time management casual games that is developed by Zylom Studios and later on by Gamehouse Studios. From the 7th game onwards, the games are developed by Gamehouse Studios and Blue Giraffe.

The games tell the story of Emily, a waitress who aspires to one day run her own restaurant, and who works in several other restaurants in order to earn the money to eventually make her dream come true.

After releasing the first 3 games of the series, Zylom decided to "renew" the series by adding some factors to it to make Emily's world more memorable and natural. As a result of this, from the fourth game onwards, the series received high appreciation and reviews from casual game critics and gamers, such as Gamezebo, who gave the seventh game, Emily's True Love, a maximum 5/5 star overall review.

History 

The idea for the series of casual games was thought of in 2005. Each individual game in the series was designed by the following people:
The first game, the special Winter Edition game
The second game: Jakko van Hunen;
The third game, Emily's Tea Garden: Jakko van Hunen and Sebastiaan van Waardenberg;
The fourth game, Emily's Taste of Fame
The fifth game, Emily's Holiday Season
The sixth game, Emily's Childhood Memories: Sebastiaan van Waardenberg;
The seventh game, Emily's True Love: Tj'íèn Twijnstra
The eighth game, Emily's Wonder Wedding: Tj'íèn Twijnstra     People

Delicious and its The Winter Edition 

The series was publicly released on September 21, 2006. Originally, players were challenged to successfully run eight restaurants that went for five days each. The first series game, however, did not have much of a storyline, and instead focused on the gameplay.

In November of the same year, a special edition of the series was released: The Winter Edition. The Winter Edition was similar to the first game, but with a winter/Christmas theme and no achievement trophies. The game was originally rated 3.5/5 stars by Gamezebo.

In 2007, the series was nominated for the 2006 Best Casual Game of the Year award.

Delicious 2 

On June 29, 2007, the second game in the series was released with a number of new features compared to the first game, such as options for the player to decorate the restaurant however they want, to put items on their plate ahead of time rather than only directly at the time that the items were ordered by a customer, and the inclusion of trophies along with a storyline with cutscenes. The game also contained five 10-day restaurants to play through, instead of the eight 5-day ones available in the first game of the series.

The main storyline of the game is as follows: Emily is asked by her Uncle Antonio to help him in his restaurants when his son Marcello runs off and leaves him to run the restaurants by himself.

Like the first game in the series, this game was rated 3.5/5 stars by Gamezebo.

Emily's Tea Garden 

On September 24, 2008, the third game in the series, Emily's Tea Garden, was released. The game was similar to the second game, its only changes being a greater variety of dishes and reservations, as well as mini-game in which the player collects mice.

In this game, the main storyline is that Emily wants to pursue her dream of running her own tea garden. But for this to be achieved, she must apply for a loan at the local bank, for which she needs the aid of Uncle Antonio. He helps her get a waiting job at a friend's restaurant so she can earn the money she needs, and through referrals, Emily gets to work at three other restaurants before she finally earns enough money to be able to make her dream come true in the last restaurant, being the tea garden itself.

Like the first two games in the series, this game was rated 3.5/5 stars by Gamezebo.

Emily's Taste of Fame 

On June 3, 2009, the fourth game in the series, Emily's Taste of Fame, was released. This game included "special events" that change daily and need to be completed separately from the normal time management gameplay, as well as a change in how the storyline is displayed: from classic cutscenes to an inclusion during the gameplay instead. The game also picked up a cast of more than 30 characters, making it the game with the largest cast of talking characters and the largest number of emotions per character of any casual time management game available to the public at the time of its release.

The main storyline of the game is as follows: Emily is offered a chance to host her own cooking show on television. Unfortunately, her car breaks down during the trip to the studio. As she tries to find help getting her car fixed, she, in turn, decides to lend a helping hand to others out of sheer kindness.

Gamezebo rated the game 4.5/5 stars, higher than its rating for the first 3 games of the series.

The game was also nominated three times by the 2010 GameHouse Great Game Awards in the gaming categories Game of the Year, the Game of the Year People's Choice, and the Top Time Management Games. It won the award in the category of Top Time Management Games.

Delicious: Emily's Holiday Season 
On November 18, 2009, Delicious 5 was released as Delicious: Emily's Holiday Season. Emily has settled in a little town called Snuggford to celebrate the holidays with her friends and family. Meanwhile, two handsome young men, Paul and Richard, are being introduced to Emily's life. Emily finds herself having to choose between the two young men, as well as dealing with problems among friends and family.

Gamezebo rated the game 4 out of 5 stars, and praised the well-written story and dialogue.

Note:There is a Bug in original edition. Players can earn the trophy "Queue 10 actions"(which was not able to acquired) in updated v5.0.0.1776 edition。

Delicious: Emily's Childhood Memories 
Delicious 6 or Delicious: Emily's Childhood Memories was first released as Premium Edition on February 3, 2011.

In this game, Emily goes to the house she grew up in as child because her parents are about to sell it. While there, she, her sister Angela, her parents, and her friend Francois remember all the things that happened to them at the house, from Angela's baby days to meeting Francois for the first time to Emily's prom night.

Gamezebo rated the game 4.5 out of 5 stars.

Delicious: Emily's Childhood Memories won the "Best of 2011 award" in the Time Management category on Jayisgames.com

Delicious: Emily's Childhood Memories won "Best Casual Game 2011" from Dutch Game Awards.

Delicious: Emily's Childhood Memories Platinum/Premium Edition

A special edition of this game was also released, with bonus features that include six additional upgrades, a comprehensive in-game strategy guide, a concept art video, and a Delicious screensaver.

Delicious: Emily's True Love 
Delicious 7 or Delicious: Emily's True Love was released as Premium Edition on November 30, 2011. The new Delicious game takes place one year after Emily has opened her own restaurant. Her restaurant is doing well, then a love letter arrives and turns her world upside down. Emily must travel the world to find her true love, helping out at restaurants along the way.

Gamezebo rated the game 5 out of 5 stars, and it is the first game in the series to get this maximum rating.

Delicious: Emily's True Love Platinum/Premium Edition

A special edition of this game was also released, with bonus features that include 10 bonus game play levels, 10 exclusive restaurant items, a helpful strategy guide, a Delicious screensaver, and Delicious (computer) wallpapers.

Delicious - Emily's Big Surprise 
Delicious - Emily's Big Surprise is a mini-game consisting of four levels. It takes place after Delicious - Emily's True Love when Emily returns home and is dating Patrick. In this mini-game, Emily's cat Snuggy is pregnant. Emily doesn't tell Patrick at first, and her actions in the game leads Patrick to be confused and jump to his own conclusions.

On October 1, 2015, the mini-game was released on its own, completely free, for tablets only.

Delicious: Emily's Wonder Wedding 
Delicious 8 or Delicious: Emily's Wonder Wedding is the first game in the series to be divided into "episodes". On every Friday starting from June 29, 2012 and ending on November 23, 2012, a new episode was released. Resulting in a total of 25 episodes and 50 levels with 2 levels in each episode (normal game only, platinum/premium has more episodes). The full game was later released to purchase as a whole. In this game, Emily is getting ready to marry Patrick when Patrick's mother and ex-girlfriend Iris show up and complicate things for the couple.

Delicious: Emily's Wonder Wedding Platinum/Premium Edition 

A special edition of this game was also released, with bonus features that include a bonus restaurant with five episodes, a musical soundtrack, Delicious (computer) wallpapers, and a gallery of Emily throughout the years.

Delicious: Emily's Honeymoon Cruise 

Delicious 9 or Delicious: Emily's Honeymoon Cruise was the second game in the series to be divided into episodes. The full game was released on September 26, 2013. The option of playing the full game is only available if the game was bought before October 4, 2013. If bought on October 4, 2013 or later, the customer has to wait for a new episode each week. The game has 17 episodes (normal game only, platinum/premium has more episodes).

In the story line, Emily and Patrick are going on a cruise for their honeymoon. Patrick tells Emily he wants to have kids, but Emily isn't ready yet. While on the cruise, Emily and Patrick discover that the whole family is helping on the cruise.

Delicious: Emily's Honeymoon Cruise is slightly different from the other games in the series. In this game, players get to control characters other than Emily in shops other than restaurants, as players help Emily's sister Angela in the cruise ship's boutique, Patrick's mom in the cruise ship's spa, and help Emily out on the cruise ship's daycare.

Delicious: Emily's Honeymoon Cruise Platinum/Premium Edition 

A special edition of this game was also released, with bonus features that include a bonus restaurant, a concept art, and a Delicious (computer) wallpaper.

Delicious: Emily's New Beginning

Delicious: Emily's New Beginning was released in the fall of 2014. The game was playable for GameHouse's and Zylom's FunPass players before non-subscribers were able to play it. In this game, Emily and Patrick are taking care of their baby girl, Paige. This proves to be quite the challenge, as Emily longs for the restaurant business again. The gameplay mostly concerns her struggles with balancing her work life and motherhood at the same time.

The game had a special Christmas Edition, as well as a Valentine's Edition.

Delicious: Emily's Home Sweet Home

Delicious: Emily's Home Sweet Home was released on 4 June 2015 for GameHouse's and Zylom's FunPass subscribers, and was to be released for non-subscribers on 18 June 2015. It was later release 19 June 2015, the next day. Emily and Patrick have bought a new house to raise their family in but everything is not as happy as it seems.
Paige becomes best friends with Grace, another 2 year old from the neighbourhood but when Grace has an accident at Emily's new house her mother will do whatever it takes to stop them from living in that neighbourhood.

Delicious: Emily's Hopes and Fears
Delicious: Emily's Hopes and Fears was released on November 18, 2015 for GameHouse's and Zylom's FunPass players and on Kindle. iOS, Android and general GameHouse and Zylom public followed 2 weeks later. Allison Heart, the main character in another Gamehouse games, Heart's Medicine (a medical drama game), is present in the game. The plot of this game is that Paige is sick with a mysterious disease and Patrick sets out to find a flower that he believes will cure her.

Delicious: Emily's Message in a Bottle 
Delicious:     Emily's Message in a Bottle was released on August 4, 2016 on PC, iOS and Android, as well as Mac. Emily and her family go on a search for her Grandfather and Edward & Antonio's Brothers in Napoli, Italy to celebrate their Family Reunion.

Delicious: Emily's Christmas Carol 
Delicious: Emily's Christmas Carol was released on October 17, 2016. It is sequel of Delicious: Emily's Message in a Bottle. Emily's Family goes on a Christmas Vacation in Santa's House and they need to Get Ready for Paige's Christmas Play.

Delicious: Emily's Miracle of Life 
Delicious: Emily's Miracle of Life was released on August 2, 2017. It is the 15th game entry in the Delicious series.
Emily and Patrick, along with their family and friends, welcome new members of the O'Malley family.

Delicious: Emily's Moms vs Dads 
Delicious: Emily's Moms vs Dads was released on December 12, 2017. It is the 16th game entry in the Delicious series.
In this storyline, the Emily starts off at a restaurant where her brand is being advertised. While working there the fathers of all the children challenged the mothers that one of them is the best parent. Emily and her friends all go from a restaurant, a campground, Emily's backyard, and many more places in between. The competition makes its way onto TV making it harder for the fathers to concentrate on being good fathers.

Delicious: Emily's Road Trip 
Delicious: Emily's Road Trip will be released sometime in May 2019. It is the 17th game entry in the Delicious series.
Emily and her family go for the nostalgic trip to remember of U.S. Route 66. Betty's Diner will make a return in the game.

Delicious World
Delicious World was released in June 2019. It is the 18th game entry in the Delicious series, though it serves as a "soft reboot" of the storyline. Its starting point takes place during the events of Delicious: Emily's True Love. The story spins in a different direction from there on. 
Emily is working hard at the family restaurant, preparing a recipe for a local cooking contest. But then a love letter arrives and turns her world upside down. Emily must travel the world to find her true love, helping out at restaurants along the way.

Gameplay 
In the Delicious games, players take the role of Emily, and are given the task to run a restaurant. Customers come in, alone or in a group, and choose to either sit down at a table or take out. Emily must serve them their order, and accept payment, before they become impatient and leave. Order sizes vary from 1 to 2 items for a single customer, and up to 4 items for a group. Fast service and entertainment, along with creative restaurant decorating, can keep the customers happy and result in a bigger tip.

Serving orders 
There are a number of types of items that customers can order, which increases in number and complexity as the game progresses.
 Items that are ready to serve, and have no limit capacity. When ordered, these items can be served right away, without preparing or restocking.
 Items that need to be combined, and restocked after a few servings. Nachos, for instance, need to be combined with a dip before they can be served. The Nacho-machine holds only a number of servings, and needs to be refilled when or before it's empty, before nachos can be served again.
 Items that are first combined, and then stocked up to 9 items. Ice cream for instance is made by combining basic vanilla ice cream with a choice of fruit.
 Items that are first grilled or baked, and then prepared. Crepes for instance are first baked a few seconds, and are then combined with ice cream. Steaks can be prepared as medium or well-done, depending on how long it's grilled. These items will burn if they are baked too long though.
 Items that are prepared using a timer that must be stopped in time, such as crème brûlée or profiteroles, as well as drinks such as coffee and milkshakes.
 Tea is served by combining tea leaves with water. When Emily is out of a certain type of leaves, she must pick new ones and restock them.

Cleaning 
Aside from serving customers their orders, Emily must also keep the tables in the restaurant clean, when customers have used them. If there are no clean tables available when new customers that were planning on sitting down come in, they will leave.

Although cleaning the tables is just a matter of one click, it does take up valuable time. During some point in each restaurant, help is automatically hired to clean the tables.

Entertainment 
Customers can be very impatient. This is why after a few days of a restaurant, an entertainer is introduced. When an entertainer is sent to a table with customers, this will make them happy and give them more patience while they wait to be served. Happier customers also leave bigger tips. In the first Delicious there are chocolates instead of an entertainer, and in Delicious: Emily's Holiday Season, newspapers are used instead of an entertainer in the Snuggford Hotel. In Delicious: Emily's Honeymoon Cruise and Delicious: Emily's New Beginning, the entertainer has to be bought in the shop. In Delicious: Emily's Home Sweet Home, some entertainers are automatically hired and some have to be bought in the shop. After Delicious: Emily's New Beginning, players are unable to see a red heart showing up next to ecstatic customers.

Decorating 
Aside from the profit Emily makes during a day, she can earn a certain amount of money that can be spent on decorating her restaurant. These decorations vary from new furniture, to aesthetic items like paintings and plants. A well-decorated restaurant keeps the customers happy and patient, and result in bigger tips.

Mouse mini-game 
Delicious: Emily's Tea Garden introduced two new features. One is the mouse mini-game. A mouse is hidden in each level, popping into view every now and then. To catch it, the player must click on it, adding 100 points to the day's score. The player will hear a squeak when the mouse appears on screen. The mouse can be easy or hard to find. This mini-game has continued into every game after Delicious: Emily's Tea Garden.

Reservations 
The other new feature Delicious: Emily's Tea Garden introduced is reservations. At one level in the game, a telephone will appear. The player can click on it when it rings and after the player clicks on the phone a bar will appear showing the size of the group and when the customers will arrive. The player must then grab a reservation card, under the phone, and place it on a table with enough seats for the group. No other customers can sit at a table with a reservation card. When the timer is empty, the customers arrive. If they can take a seat at a table with a reservation card, the player gets a 100-point bonus. Aside from one mini-game in Delicious: Emily's Wonder Wedding, Delicious: Emily's Tea Garden is the only Delicious game to have reservations.

Easter eggs 
In Delicious: Emily's Tea Garden, Delicious: Emily's Taste Of Fame, Delicious: Emily's Holiday Season, and Delicious: Emily's Childhood Memories, Easter eggs are hidden around different levels in each game. If the player finds all Easter eggs in the games, a trophy is awarded. Also, in Delicious: Emily's Childhood Memories, a small memory card mini-game is hidden in each restaurant. Winning the memory card mini-game awards the player extra time. In Delicious: Emily's Honeymoon Cruise and Delicious: Emily's New Beginning, a mini game is hidden on the main menu. In Delicious: Emily's Home Sweet Home, a mini-game is hidden on the map.

Menu choices 

In Delicious: Emily's New Beginning, a new feature was added that allows players to make menu choices according to preferences of customers. At the beginning of each restaurant day, the player gets two options per dish of which one can be chosen according to the customers that are expected that day. In Delicious: Emily's Home Sweet Home, the player starts with menu choices that they can not change. Achieving specific goals in each restaurant unlocks new menu options, then the player can then choose what menu items to use. Most menu items have special bonus: faster preparation, bonus tip, spill proof, or burn proof and some menu items have multiple bonuses.

Spin-offs 
Over the last years, GameHouse has released various spin-offs series and games of the Delicious series that make a shared universe over the time. The fan names for the in-game universe are Snuggford Universe or Delicious Universe, but Gamehouse use the name Gamehouse Original Stories to name this universe.

Hometown Poker Hero 
A poker game with a story released in 2014. The game is setting on the city of Shipsburgh that where Jimmy is born and grow, He return in town to help Angela to create her first fashion shop. But the city is now on the control of the Grimaldi Syndicte and the player character must help the city people to fight them in poker and rebuy all the place of town.

Fabulous 
Fabulous: Angela's Sweet Revenge was released in early July 2015. The spin-off game was released as a demo version with only four levels. This game stars Angela, Emily's younger sister. The game has Angela working in a boutique in New York City, where she now lives with her husband Jimmy. During gameplay, Angela discovers that her husband is cheating on her with her boss. At the end of the game, Angela quits working, leaves Jimmy, and the game ends with Angela telling her best friends that she thinks she's pregnant.

The first full Fabulous game called Fabulous: Angela's Fashion Fever, was released April 21, 2016. The game is a sequel and continuation of Angela's Sweet Revenge. Angela must overcome obstacles on the TV contest "Become Truly", who is Angela's fashion idol. After witnessing Truly's true colors, Angela convinces the other contestants and crew to help her with unveiling who Truly is to the rest of the world.

Fabulous: Angela's High School Reunion, was released March 18, 2017. The game continues with Angela's life in the Big Apple, now co-managing a store with former contestant and winner of "Become Truly" and friend, Victoria. Angela is planning her high school reunion with friends. When her old high school rival, Janet, comes back into her life, Angela falls into a downward spiral starting with envy and anger, leading up to their imprisonment.

Fabulous: Angela's Wedding Disaster, was released April 30, 2018. The game introduces us to Angela's new boss, Sebastian and Caroline, a young talented musician who is Fran's fiancée. Angela continues on her quest to become the greatest fashion designer, working for Sebastian's chain of high-end fashion franchise stores. Angela and the girls help Caroline and Fran plan their wedding and overcome their own obstacles in the story.

Fabulous: Angela's True Colors, was released in January 2019. The story is about Angela opening her first store in New York.

Fabulous: New York to LA, was released on September 19, 2019. The game plot revolves around Angela Napoli, a fashion designer who goes to Hollywood.

Heart's Medicine 
Heart's Medicine is a series of time management games with a hospital theme. The games follow the story of Dr. Allison Heart and her medical journey alongside other physicians. The game combines casual gaming with medical drama. Dr. Allison Heart appeared in Delicious: Emily's Hopes and Fears 5 years after her first appearance in Heart's Medicine: Season One. The game features gameplay similar to the Delicious series and also features a mouse mini game, but with a guinea pig called Oliver that escapes from pediatrics. Emily O'Malley also makes a cameo appearance.

Heart's Medicine: Season One was released on November 3, 2010. Allison has just started her residency at Little Creek Clinic, when her feelings towards another doctor are put to the test. The game consists of five episodes with five shifts each, 25 levels in total. A remastered edition of the same name was released in May 2019 with better graphics while also adding 5 more shifts to each episode, an epilogue with 10 shifts, and 30 challenge levels. The remaster has 90 levels in total.

Heart's Medicine: Time to Heal was released on May 17, 2016. The love drama between Allison and her colleagues from Season One continues in this game. Allison must deal with her complicated love life involving the Head of the Hospital while working near her old flame at Little Creek Hospital. Things take a dramatic turn with a horrifying accident that will affect all of the hospital staff.

Heart's Medicine: Hospital Heat was released on May 11, 2017. This game picks up right after the previous compelling adventure at Little Creek Hospital. Things get even more complicated when Allison receives a phone call from her mother whom she hasn't seen in 20 years. The game delves deeper into Allison's past and her roller-coaster love life.

Heart’s Medicine: Doctor’s Oath was released for the iOS on October 10, 2018 and Android on December 4, 2018. The PC version was released on May 21, 2020.

Cathy's Crafts 
Cathy's Crafts was released on July 6, 2016. Cathy is a resident of Snuggford with a kind heart and creative mind. Cathy has a passion for crafting and runs a number of craft shops in Snuggford. Cathy must decide between staying in her family's hardware store or follow her boyfriend to New York to become an art buyer. The game has similar gameplay and features a mouse mini game as well. Emily and Paige O'Malley make a cameo appearance in the game.

Dr. Cares 
Dr. Cares - Pet Rescue 911 is a spin-off game of the Delicious series. The game was released on April 12, 2017. Dr. Amy Cares is a veterinary graduate who returns to Snuggford to her grandfather's vet clinic and eventually takes over the vet business. Both Emily and Paige O'Malley make a cameo appearance when Paige's bunny is sick and Amy cares for him. This is Amy's first game in the series.

The second installment, Dr. Cares - Amy's Pet Clinic was released March 29, 2018. The game follows Amy, who is now the head vet at her grandfather's clinic. While trying to juggle her new responsibility and face her fears when her childhood bully returns to Snuggford, Amy has a lot of work cut out for her.

The third installment, Dr. Cares - Family Practice was released November 15, 2018. Amy is reunited with her estranged mother, Alice, and decides to help her with birth of Dolphin pups. Meanwhile, Jack and crew are facing a mysterious biological hazard at Snuggford. Dr. Cares - Family Practice introduces decision-making scenarios, rendering different endings for the game.

Mary le Chef 
The first installment of the game, Mary le Chef - Cooking Passion was released on January 18, 2017. Mary is a talented law student and aspiring chef, but her family's dreams for her don't reflect her own. Mary will have to choose her own path as she tries to balance her career with her goals. The game features hidden object elements, a mouse mini game, and a cameo appearance from Emily as well.

Maggie's Movies 
Maggie's Movies: Camera, Action! was released on March 22, 2017. It's a new addition to the Delicious game universe. This first instalment tells an engaging story about Maggie, an aspiring film director, as she faces different challenges during her job as a film director assistant in Hollywood.

Maggie's Movies: Second Shot was released as a sequel on November 21, 2019. Movie Mogul Maggie directs her first feature-length film.

Sally's Salon 
Sally's Salon - Beauty Secrets was released June 29, 2017. Early Sally's Salon game series didn't feature any correlation to Emily and Delicious game series. However, the fifth instalment in the series, Sally's Salon: Beauty Secrets, features Francois, Emily's best friend and considered as a remake of the series. Sally is a feisty hairdresser who is on a mission to beautify women across the globe - all while searching for her long lost love. Francois joined her as her new side-kick on this hilarious journey.

The second game of Sally's Salon series Sally's Salon - Kiss & Make-Up was released June 21, 2018. Join Sally and Francois on their biggest adventure yet! Sally’s Salon – Kiss & Make-Up is a thrilling tale of passion, love, danger, intrigue, bizarre absurdity and of course: beauty salons! Sally buys a salon at Happyville's Wellness Center, at the request of her childhood friend, April, who has sinister intentions. Sally meets many new friends along the way, and a possible love interest. Cameos from Snuggford Universe characters include: Angela, Parker and Lane.

Mortimer Beckett 
Mortimer Beckett and the Book of Gold was released on October 26, 2017. Mortimer Beckett is a hidden object game. The first four Mortimer Beckett games didn't feature any correlation to Delicious game series. However, the fifth instalment Mortimer Beckett and the Book of Gold features Kate O'Malley, Patrick's sister and Emily's sister-in-law.

The Love Boat 
A time-management game series based on the television series of the 80's The Love Boat produced by Aaron Spelling. All the crew of the Pacific Princess on the TV show are in the game and have designs based on the actors that played them. The first game called The Love Boat was released November 30, 2017 and is based on the first episode of the first season of the TV show and Emily and Angela are Guest Stars.

The sequel, The Love Boat - Second Chances was released on February 21, 2019. GameHouse Originals guest stars include Sally and Francois on their voyage to Acapulco.

Parker & Lane 
Parker & Lane - Criminal Justice is a Time-Management game with a police procedure theme that was released February 23, 2018. The gameplay is similar to the Delicious and Heart's Medicine game series. Some of the levels are on the crime scenes and some are setting on the police station or the forensic lab.

Parker & Lane - Twisted Minds is a sequel to the original game, which was released December 13, 2018.

Amber’s Airline 
Amber's Airline is a new entry in the GameHouse Original Stories. It centres on Amber, a young woman who is passionate about becoming a flight attendant. The game was released on August 23, 2018.

Amber's Airline - 7 Wonders is a sequel that was released March 21, 2019. Amber and her colleagues travel from Italy to India, China to Peru, finally making their way to Brazil. Amber must decide on what to do about her love life and facing her past.

Hotel Ever After 
Hotel Ever After: Ella’s Dream is a time-management entry in the GameHouse Original Stories. The game uses a fairy-tale theme with a hotel management story. It was released on July 9, 2019.

Welcome to Primrose Lake 
A new entry in the GameHouse Original Stories, Welcome to Primrose Lake is a new time-management mystery where everyone has a secret, and there’s no place to hide from the past. The game has been released for the iOS, as well as the Android system on August 13, 2019 and later got a PC release on September 12, 2019.

Detective Jackie: Mystic Case 
New addition to the GameHouse Original Stories, Detective Jackie: Mystic Case is a time-management game. It was released on November 7, 2019.

Unsung Heroes: The Golden Mask 
New addition to the GameHouse Original Stories, Unsung Heroes: The Golden Mask follows three characters as they search for lost treasure. They stumble upon the story of Xi Niu, a Chinese girl who lived over a thousand years ago. The game switches back and forth between modern day and ancient China as the player restores artefacts and starts to fill in the story behind them. The game was released on January 16, 2020.

References

External links 
 Delicious series Official Delicious series page
 Delicious at Zylom
 Delicious: Winter Edition Deluxe at Zylom
 Delicious 2 at Zylom
 Delicious: Emily's Tea Garden at Zylom
 Delicious: Emily's Taste of Fame at Zylom
 Delicious: Emily's Holiday Season at Zylom
 Delicious: Emily's Childhood Memories at Zylom
 Delicious: Emily's True Love at Zylom
 Delicious: Emily's Wonder Wedding at Zylom
 Delicious: Emily's Honeymoon Cruise at Zylom
 Delicious: Emily's New Beginning at Zylom
 Delicious: Emily's Home Sweet Home at Zylom

Casual games
Video games developed in the Netherlands
Video games featuring female protagonists
RealNetworks
Time management video games
Video game franchises